Frohnmayer or Frohnmaier is a surname. Notable people with the surname include:

 David B. Frohnmayer, 15th president of the University of Oregon
 John Frohnmayer, retired attorney from the U.S. state of Oregon
 Mark Frohnmayer, American entrepreneur
 Markus Frohnmaier, German politician

See also
 Dave and Lynn Frohnmayer Pedestrian and Bicycle Bridge
 MarAbel B. Frohnmayer Music Building